Danilo Michelini (born 5 March 1917 in Lucca; died on 8 December 1983 in Lucca) was an Italian professional football player and coach, who played as a forward.

He played for 9 seasons (208 games, 77 goals) in the Serie A for A.S. Lucchese Libertas 1905, A.S. Roma, A.C. Torino, A.S. Livorno Calcio and ACF Fiorentina.

He was among the top 10 scorers of the Serie A for three seasons (1936–37: 13 goals; 1937–38: 16 goals, third best scorer; 1938–39: 13 goals, fourth best scorer).

1917 births
1983 deaths
Italian footballers
Serie A players
Serie B players
S.S.D. Lucchese 1905 players
A.S. Roma players
Torino F.C. players
U.S. Livorno 1915 players
ACF Fiorentina players
Genoa C.F.C. players
A.C. Prato players
Italian football managers
Association football forwards